The crimson cleaner fish (Suezichthys aylingi), or butcher's dick in Australia, is a species of wrasse native to the southwestern Pacific Ocean around Australia and New Zealand. It is a cleaner fish. Males of this species can reach a length of  SL while females only reach .

References

Crimson cleaner fish
Fish described in 1985